Etienne Pays (born 2 November 1948) is a Belgian molecular biologist and professor at the Universite Libre de Bruxelles. His research interest is on trypanosomes.

He obtained a PhD in Zoology from the Universite Libre de Bruxelles (ULB) in 1974, and an Aggregation for Higher Education in 1984. Since January 1998, he is Professor at the ULB and since October 1992, Director of the Laboratory of Molecular Parasitology. From 1993 until 1996, he was President of the Belgian Society of Protozoology.

In 1996, he was awarded the Francqui Prize on Biological and Medical Sciences for his work on molecular biology. In 1997, he was awarded the Carlos J. Finlay Prize for Microbiology (UNESCO, Paris). In 2000, he was awarded the Quinquennal Prize for fundamental biomedical sciences (FNRS).

References
 Vanhollebeke B, De Muylder G, Nielsen MJ, Pays A, Tebabi P, Dieu M, Raes M, Moestrup SK, Pays E., A haptoglobin-hemoglobin receptor conveys innate immunity to Trypanosoma brucei in humans, Science. 2008 May 2;320(5876):677–81.
 Vanhollebeke B, Truc P, Poelvoorde P, Pays A, Joshi PP, Katti R, Jannin JG, Pays E., Human Trypanosoma evansi infection linked to a lack of apolipoprotein L-I., N Engl J Med. 2006 Dec 28;355(26):2752–6.
 Vanhamme L, Paturiaux-Hanocq F, Poelvoorde P, Nolan DP, Lins L, Van Den Abbeele J, Pays A, Tebabi P, Van Xong H, Jacquet A, Moguilevsky N, Dieu M, Kane JP, De Baetselier P, Brasseur R, Pays E., Apolipoprotein L-I is the trypanosome lytic factor of human serum, Nature. 2003 Mar 6;422(6927):83–7.

External links
 Etienne Pays
 Patents

1948 births
Living people
Academic staff of the Université libre de Bruxelles
Belgian molecular biologists
Université libre de Bruxelles alumni